Mount Frederick Clarke is a mountain located east of Knowlesville, New Brunswick.

Name origin
The mountain is named for Dr. George Frederick Clarke (1883-1974), a noted archaeologist, author and historian.

The name was bestowed in July 1974.

See also
List of mountains of New Brunswick

References

External links 
 https://web.archive.org/web/20120316110900/http://peakery.com/Mount-Frederick-Clarke/
 http://www.canmaps.com/topo/places/d/dafmh.htm

Mountains of New Brunswick
Landforms of Carleton County, New Brunswick
Mountains of Canada under 1000 metres